Kharbala (Xarbala) is a rural locality (a selo), the administrative centre of and one of two settlements, in addition to Chengere, in Magassky Rural Okrug of Verkhnevilyuysky District in the Sakha Republic, Russia. Its population as of the 2010 Census was 538, of whom were 269 male and 269 female, down from 541 as recorded during the 2002 Census.

References

Notes

Sources
Official website of the Sakha Republic. Registry of the Administrative-Territorial Divisions of the Sakha Republic. Verkhnevilyuysky District. 

Rural localities in Verkhnevilyuysky District